Eduardo Marturet (born September 19, 1953) is a Venezuelan conductor and composer represented by Tempo Primo. He is the Music Director and Conductor of The Miami Symphony Orchestra (MISO).

Biography 
Eduardo Marturet enjoys an active career on three continents. As the Music Director and Conductor of The Miami Symphony Orchestra, he remains deeply involved in the musical life of his native Venezuela and continues to guest conduct actively in Europe. He has made more than 60 CDs that range from a Brahms orchestral cycle to surveys of Latin America's greatest orchestral composers.
 
European orchestras with which he has had an active guest conducting relationship include Berliner Symphoniker, European Community Chamber Orchestra, Staatsphilharmonie Rheinland-Pfalz, RAI Symphony Orchestra, Danish Radio Symphony, Royal Flemish Philarmonique, Nordwestdeutsche Philharmonie, Gelders Orkest, Bohemian Chamber Philharmonic, Budapest Radio Symphony, Brabant Orkest, and Concertgebouw Chamber Orchestra in Amsterdam. In 2001, he led the Berliner Symphoniker on a 12-concert tour of major South American cities including Caracas, São Paulo, Cordoba, Montevideo and Buenos Aires. A documentary of the tour was broadcast through the region by DirecTV.
 
Born in Caracas, Marturet studied in Cambridge, England where he became firmly rooted in the European tradition, obtaining a degree in Piano, Percussion, Conducting, and Composition. In 1979, he returned to Venezuela with a permanent position with the Orquesta Filarmónica de Caracas as Associate Conductor and later as Artistic Director to the Orquesta Sinfónica Venezuela, where he served in that position until 1995. Presently, he maintains close contact with the Venezuelan National Youth Orchestra movement, giving advice and support in aid of poor children.
 
With the opening of the Teresa Carreño Theatre in Caracas in 1984, Marturet became its first Music Director. After three years of bringing challenging and original productions to the stage, he resigned from the Theatre to dedicate himself entirely to an international career, conducting in Italy, Greece, France, Spain, England, Denmark, Holland, Korea, Norway, Sweden, Germany, Czechoslovakia, Belgium, Canada and the United States.
 
He made his Asian debut with the Seoul Philharmonic in 2003, a year when he also opened the Chorin Summer Festival in Berlin and made his debut with the Buenos Aires Philharmonic in Argentina and the Florida Philharmonic in Miami.

In 2006, he received a Latin Grammy nomination for "Encantamento" in the category of Best Classical Album conducting the Berliner Symphoniker.

Since 2006 he has been the Music Director and Conductor of the Miami Symphony Orchestra, during his 15-year tenure Maestro Marturet has taken MISO into the world-class professional symphony of Miami developing a unique classical-crossover repertoire in alliance with great producers such as Emilio Estefan, Rudy Perez and Burt Bacharach.

In October 2012, he was named one of the “100 most influential latinos in Miami”. The ceremony was performed by Fusionarte Association, Pan-American Foundation and Televisa publishing. This same year, in March, the flag of the United States was flown over the U.S. Capitol in honor of Eduardo Marturet, who received the Medal of Merit of the U.S. Congress in recognition for his outstanding and invaluable service to the community.

More recently, in 2019, was included into the Genius 100 Visions Group, “an active and engaged community of 100 exceptionally imaginative and impactful human beings. Genius 100 brings accomplished and compassionate minds together to re-imagine the future - and to implement creative initiatives to improve it.

The organization is inspired by Albert Einstein’s words: “A new type of thinking is essential if mankind is to survive and move toward higher levels,” and it includes world renown luminaries like US Justice Ruth Bader Ginsburg, architect Frank Gehry, and conductor Zubin Mehta, all great visionaries [who] raise the bar on what is achievable within their fields. Collectively, in collaboration, they can make the impossible possible.

His wife Athina Klioumi is a Greek born actress, fashion model, producer philanthropist that supports The Miami Symphony Orchestra.

Highlights 

 2014: Eduardo Marturet becomes a Steinway Artist.
 2012: Marturet is awarded a Medal of Honor to the Merit of Congress. In March 2012, the flag of the United States was flown over the U.S. Capitol in honor of Eduardo Marturet, together with the Medal of Honor to the Merit of Congress. Marturet was honored with a lifetime achievement award for having made significant contributions to the development of the U.S. The awards ceremony took place on April 19 in the U.S. House Committee in D.C.
 2010: Johnnie Walker Black Label "Walk With Giants." Eduardo Marturet was honored to be the first Venezuelan chosen to participate in the "Walk with Giants" campaign by Johnnie Walker Black Label which culminated in a special concert for 6,000 people, 50 billboards across major cities, and this video specially produced for cinema. 
 2010: MISO releases its first recording: Trumpet Glamour with Francisco Flores. Album details...
 2010: The Miami Symphony Orchestra (MISO) and Eduardo Marturet agree to a second five-year contract as Music Director and Conductor. "The decision to renew his contract is of the utmost importance for the Board of Directors. We want to be able to count on his direction and leadership as he continues to strengthen the artistic content and music quality to levels that make all Miamians proud to truly call MISO their own orchestra." says MISO Chairman, Rafael Diaz-Balart. The renewal extends the contract through July 31, 2017.
 2006: "Encantamento" Nominated for "Best Classical Album." The Latin Grammy nominations is pleased to announce that Marturet's "Encantamento" with the Berliner Symphoniker was nominated for "Best Classical Album" of the year. Album details...
 2006: Miranda Soundtrack Wins "Best Music" at the Mérida Film Festival. The romantic soundtrack from the motion picture, "Francisco de Miranda" has won "Best Music" at the Mérida Film Festival in Venezuela. Listen and learn more about the Marturet's latest movie soundtrack. Album details...
 2006: Miami Symphony Orchestra. Eduardo Marturet is appointed Conductor and Music Director of the Miami Symphony Orchestra.
2004: Johnnie Walker 30th Anniversary Party. Marturet celebrated 30 years with a black tie event given by Johnnie Walker Black Label. Follow his footsteps from when he became number six of eight in the “clan” headed by his grandfather in Caracas through his career which took him to many places with many accomplishments. With more than 30 years of experiences, Marturet is excited about continuing to move forward to more projects, more ideas and more creations.
 2001: Berliner Latin Tour With Deutsche Bank's support, Marturet led the Berliner Symphoniker on a Latin American tour through Caracas, São Paulo, Cordoba, Buenos Aires, Montevido, Mexico and Monterrey.
 1988: Casa Bonita. This exhibit is the product if a research project concerning the scope of contemporary music and its ability to communicate, induce creative and sensitive attitudes in the public and change its intuitions.
 1987: "Official" of the Order of Orange-Nassau. The "Official" of the Order of Orange-Nassau was bestowed upon Eduardo Marturet by Queen Beatrix of Holland.

Compositions

Symphonic works

Chamber works

Film Music

Experimental works

Orchestral arrangements

Recordings

2015-2001
 Marturet – @ Zaha's Place Album details...
Elgar – Enigma Variations, Mendelssohn – Calm Sea & Prosperous Voyage – Berliner Symphoniker
Brahms – Complete Symphonies – Berliner Symphoniker
 An Evening in Vienna Live! Album details...
 Aprés un Reve. Album details...
 Beethoven – Piano Concerto No. 2. Album details...
 Canto LLano. Album details...
 Conciertos para Guitarra y Orquesta. Album details...
 Encantamento – Piazzolla, Guarnieri, Marquez, Estevez, Revueltas. Album details...
 Grieg/Mendelssohn – Piano Concertos. Album details...
 Homenaje – Revueltas, Carreño, Piazzolla, Castellanos. Album details...
 Latin Music Vol. 1. Album details...
 Marturet – Music for the film Manuela Sáenz. Album details...
 Marturet – Mantra, Canto LLano, etc. Album details...
 Memorias. Album details...
 Miranda Soundtrack. Album details...
 Mozart/Beethoven Piano Concertos. Album details...
 Oblivion. Album details...
 Opera Highlights. Album details...
 Salut d'Amour. Album details...
 Trumpet Glamour with Francisco Flores. Album details...
 Vivaldi: The Four Seasons; Piazzolla: The Four Seasons of Buenos Aires. Album details...

2000-1996 
 Beethoven – Piano Concerto No. 1. Album details...
 Beethoven – Piano Concerto No. 3. Album details...
 Beethoven – Piano Concerto No. 5. Album details...
 Beethoven – Symphony No. 7 Op.92. Album details...
 Brahms – Symphony No. 2. Album details...
 Brahms – 4 Symphonies & Overtures (re-issue). Album details...
 Fantasía Venezolana. Album details...
 Grieg – Piano Concerto. Album details...
 Mendelssohn – Piano Concerto No. 1, Capriccio Brillante. Album details...
 Mozart's mooiste muziek. Album details...
 Venezuelan Classics – works by Carreño, Montes and Marturet. Album details...

1995-1991 
 Brahms – Symphony No. 1 & Tragic Overture. Album details...
 Brahms – Symphony No. 2. Album details...
 Brahms – Symphony No. 3 & Haydn Variations. Album details...
 Brahms – Symphony No. 4 & Academic Overture. Album details...
 Brahms – Piano Concerto No. 1. Album details...
 Brahms – Piano Concerto No. 2. Album details...
 Brahms – Violin Concerto. Album details...
 Brahms – Double Concerto for Violin & Cello. Album details...
 Dvorak – Symphony No. 9 Op.95. Album details...
 Marturet – Siglos de Luz. Album details...
 Mediodía en el LLano. Album details...
 Rodrigo – Concierto de Aranjuéz. Album details...
 Strauss/Grieg/Sibelius – Lieder. Album details...
 Tchaikovsky – Piano Concerto No. 1. Album details...
 Tierra de Gracia. Album details...

1990-1983 
 Montes – Fantasía Venezolana para 2 Guitarras. Album details...
 Mozart – Divertimento in B K 137, Violin Concerto No. 3 K 216, Symphony No. 29 K 201. Album details...
 Mozart – Symphonies No. 5, 11, 13, 21, 27. Album details...
 Mozart – Violin Concertos, Adagio, Rondos. Album details...
 Mozart – Violin Concertos, Adagio, Rondos. Album details...
 Chopin – Piano Concerto No. 1, Andante Spianato & Gran Polonaise. Album details...
 Duarte – Sinfonietta La Mar. Album details...
 Beethoven – Triple Concerto, Romanza in G Op.40. Album details...
 Música Venezolana de Conciertos. Album details...
 Noche Transfigurada. Album details...

Orchestras conducted 

Principal Orchestras:
 2005–present.	Miami Symphony Orchestra
(Miami, USA)
 1991–present.	Berliner Symphoniker
(Berlin, Germany)
 1978–present.	 Venezuelan National Youth Orchestras
(Caracas, Venezuela)
 1978–present.	 Orquesta Sinfónica Simón Bolívar
(Caracas, Venezuela)
 2003 – 2005.	 Orquesta Filarmónica de Buenos Aires
(Buenos Aires, Argentina)
 1989 – 1990.	 Concertgebouw Chamber Orchestra
(Amsterdam, Netherlands)
 1988 – 1991.	 Symfoniorkesteret i Stavanger
(Stavanger, Norway)

 Orquesta Filarmonica de Cali, Cali – Colombia '11
 Orquesta Sinfonica Juvenil Teresa Carreño – Venezuela '09
 The Miami Symphony Orchestra, Miami – USA '05
 El Paso Symphony Orchestra, El Paso – USA '05
 Orquesta Sinfónica de UNCUYO, Mendoza – Argentina '04
 Florida Philharmonic, Miami – Florida '03
 Orquesta Filarmónica de Buenos Aires, Buenos Aires – Argentina '03
 Seoul Philharmonic Orchestra, Seoul – South Korea '03
 Florida Chamber Orchestra, Miami – USA '01
 Orquesta Sinfónica de Concepción Concepción – Chile '98
 Gävle Symphony Orchestra, Gävle – Sweden '98
 Bohemian Chamber Philharmonic Netherland Tourne '96
 San Jose Symphony, San Jose – California '95
 Orquesta Pablo Sarasate Pamplona, España '95
 Staatsphilharmonie Rheinland-Pfalz, Rheinland-Pfalz – Germany '93
 Royal Flemish Philarmonique, Antwerp – Belgium '92
 Budapest Concert Orchestra, Budapest – Hungary '91
 Berliner Symphoniker, Berlin – Germany '91
 Nordwestdeutsche Philharmonie, Herford – Germany '91
 Concertgebouw Chamber Orchestra, Amsterdam – Holland '89
 Orquesta Sinfónica Nacional, San José – Costa Rica '89
 Symfoniorkesteret i Stavanger, Stavanger – Norway '88
 Colorado Festival Orchestra, Colorado – USA '88
 Gelders Orkest, Arhem – Holland '88
 CRJT Orchestra,Toronto – Canada '88
 Budapest Radio Symphony, Budapest – Hungary '87
 Brabant Orkest, Denbosch – Holland '86
 Frysk Orkest, Leeuwarden – Holland '84
 Opera Teresa Carreño, Caracas – Venezuela '84
 European Community Chamber Orchestra Italian Tourne '84
 Orchestra da Camera di Torino Italian Tourne '84
 Ensamble Instrumental de Provence, Nice – France '84
 "Croissiere Musicale de Jeunes Virtuoses", France – Malta – Sicily – Greece '84
 RAI Symphony Orchestra, Roma – Italia '83
 Danish Radio Symphony, Copenhagen – Denmark '83
 Santa Cecilia Chamber Players, Roma – Italia '83
 Orquesta Sinfónica Venezuela, Caracas – Venezuela '82
 "Festivale Primavera Musicale di Roma", Roma – Italia '81
 Romanian Radio Chamber Orchestra, Roma – Italia '81
 "Croissiere Musicale de Jeunes Solistes", Greek Islands '81
 Orquesta Sinfónica Maracaibo, Maracaibo – Venezuela '80
 Orquesta Sinfónica Municipal de Caracas, Caracas – Venezuela '80
 Orquesta Filarmónica de Bogotá, Bogotá – Colombia '79
 The Cambridge Players, Cambridge – England '79
 Orquesta Sinfónica Simón Bolivar, Caracas – Venezuela '78

Orchestra tours 

 2001	–	 Berliner Symphoniker
(Latin America)
 1996	–	 Bohemian Chamber Philharmonic
(Netherlands)
 1993	–	Staatsphilharmonie Rheinland-Pfalz
(Netherlands)
 1991	–	Nordwestdeutsche Philharmonie
(Germany)
 1988	–	Gelders Orkest
(Netherlands)
 1986	–	Brabant Orkest
(Netherlands)
 1984	–	European Community Chamber Orchestra
(Italy)
 1984	–	Orchestra da Camera di Torino
(Italy)

References

External links 
 
 The Miami Symphony Orchestra (MISO)

1953 births
Living people
Alumni of the University of East Anglia
People from Caracas
Venezuelan classical musicians
Venezuelan conductors (music)
Male conductors (music)
21st-century conductors (music)
21st-century male musicians